The third season of Greece's Next Top Model (abbreviated as GNTMgr) premiered on September 10, 2018 and was the first season to air on Star Channel.

Vicky Kaya returned as the host of the show, while the judging panel consisted of model Iliana Papageorgiou, fashion designer Angelos Bratis and noted photographer Dimitris Skoulos.

The prizes for this season included a modelling contract with PLACE models in Hamburg, a cover and spread with InStyle magazine, a contract with Dust & Cream cosmetics, and a cash prize of €50,000.

Approximately 3000 girls applied for the show. 1500 girls were invited to the audition rounds. 50 girls were then selected to enter the Bootcamp. Originally, 25 girls were chosen to be contestants in this season. However, one girl decided to quit before the first photoshoot took place, and two others were eliminated right before entering the model house, narrowing down the final number of contestants to 22.

The winner of the competition was the 21-year old Eirini Noune Kazaryan.

Cast

Contestants
(Ages stated are at start of contest)

Judges
 Vicky Kaya
 Angelos Bratis
 Iliana Papageorgiou
 Dimitris Skoulos

Other cast members
 Elena Christopoulou – mentor
 Genevieve Majari – art director

Episode summaries

Episodes 1–5: Auditions 
The show kicked off with the audition phase. Auditions took place in three different cities: Athens, Thessaloniki and Heraklion. The auditions aired for the first five episodes of the show. During the auditions, the girls had a brief interview with the judges while they also walked in swimwear, if asked. In order to advance, they needed a "yes" from at least 3 of the judges.

Episodes 6–7: Bootcamp
During the bootcamp, the 70 girls that advanced from the auditions took part. The bootcamp took place in Lake Vouliagmeni and was divided in two parts; during the first part the girls had to pick a visor or a turban and pose for a photoshoot in their swimwear. Based on the photoshoot, 40 of the girls advanced to the second part of the bootcamp. For the second part of the bootcamp, the girls had to walk in a fashion runway for the Greek fashion designer Vassilis Zoulias. Based on the runway, 25 of the girls advanced to the house.
 Featured photographer: Bill Georgoussis

Episode 8: Polaroid & Sparkly In a Bathtub
Original airdate: 

Quit: Angelina Georgiou
Eliminated: Gina Chaniotaki and Vasiliki Karra
Top 3: Eirini Sterianou, Evi Ioannidou and Sofia Zachariadou
Best Photo: Sofia Zachariadou
Featured photographers: Vasilis Topouslidis, Akis Paraskevopoulos

Episode 9: Underwater Orchids
Original airdate: 

Eliminated outside of judging panel: Sofia Zachariadou
First call-out: Anna Amanatidou
Bottom two: Ioanna Desylla & Eirini Noune Kazaryan
Eliminated: Ioanna Desylla
Featured photographer: Katerina Tsatsani

Episode 10: The Makeover
Original airdate:

Episode 11: Embrace Your New Look 
Original airdate: 

First call-out: Evelina Skichko
Bottom two: Agapi Olagbegi & Katerina Visseri
Eliminated: Agapi Olagbegi
Featured photographer: Thanassis Krikis

Episode 12: Africa 
Original airdate: 

First call-out: Garifallia Kalifoni
Bottom two: Elda Laska & Katerina Visseri
Eliminated: Katerina Visseri
Featured photographer: Genevieve Majari

Episode 13: Urban Superheroes 
Original airdate: 

First call-out: Elena Kalliontzi
Bottom two: Eirini Sterianou & Elda Laska
Eliminated: Elda Laska
Featured photographer: George Malekakis

Episode 14: Awareness 
Original airdate: 

First call-out: Mikaela Fotiadis
Bottom two: Eirini Ermidou & Marianna Mantesi
Eliminated: Marianna Mantesi
Featured photographer: Ioanna Ηadjiandreou

Episode 15: Boys & Girls
Original airdate: 

Quit: Garifallia Kalifoni
First call-out: Evi Ioannidou
Bottom two: Elena Kalliontzi & Eirini Noune Kazarian
Eliminated: Elena Kalliontzi
Featured photographer: Freddie F

Episode 16: Runaway Bride
Original airdate: 

First call-out: Evelina Skichko & Eirini Ermidou
Bottom two: Meggy Ndrio & Rozana Koutsoukou
Eliminated: Meggy Ndrio
Featured photographer: Apostolis Koukousas

Episode 17: Balance
Original airdate: 

First call-out: Marianna Painesi
Bottom two: Rozana Koutsoukou & Xanthi Tzerefou
Eliminated: Rozana Koutsoukou
Featured photographer: Aggelos Potamianos

Episode 18: Styling on a Rush
Original airdate: 

First call-out: Evi Ioannidou
Bottom two: Ioanna Sarri & Eirini Sterianou
Eliminated: Eirini Sterianou
Featured photographer: Nikos Mastoras

Episode 19: Captivating Animals
Original airdate: 

First call-out: Eirini Noune Kazaryan
Bottom two: Anna Amanatidou & Ioanna Sarri
Eliminated: Ioanna Sarri
Featured photographer: Panos Giannakopoulos

Episode 20: Extreme Masterchef
Original airdate: 

First call-out: Eirini Noune Kazaryan
Bottom two: Mikaela Fotiadi & Anna Tsakouridou
Eliminated: Anna Tsakouridou
Featured photographer: Stefanos Papadopoulos

Episode 21: Colours of Motherhood
Original airdate: 

First call-out: Anna Amanatidou
Bottom two: Christianna Skoura & Eirini Noune Kazaryan
Eliminated: Christianna Skoura
Featured photographer: George Aggelis

Episode 22: Dolls
Original airdate: 

Quit: Xanthi Tzerefou
Returned: Agapi Olagbegi, Anna Tsakouridou & Elda Laska
First call-out: Elda Laska
Bottom two: Agapi Olagbegi & Mikaela Fotiadi
Eliminated: Agapi Olagbegi
Featured photographer: Vasilis Topouslidis

Episode 23: Speed
Original airdate: 

Immune: Marianna Painesi
First call-out: Evelina Skichko 
Bottom two: Mikaela Fotiadi & Evi Ioannidou
Eliminated: Mikaela Fotiadi
Featured photographer: Marios Gavoyiannis

Episode 24: Androgynous
Original airdate: 

First call-out: Marianna Painesi
Bottom two: Anna Tsakouridou & Anna Amanatidou
Eliminated: Anna Tsakouridou
Featured photographer: Kosmas Koumianos

Episode 25: Video Clip
Original airdate: 

First call-out: Anna Amanatidou
Bottom two: Elda Laska & Eirini Ermidou
Eliminated: Both

Episode 26: Crystal Ball Magic
Original airdate: 

First call-out: Eirini Noune Kazaryan
Bottom two: Anna Amanatidou & Evi Ioannidou
Eliminated: Evi Ioannidou
Featured photographer: Bill Georgoussis

Episode 27: Winter Dynasty
Original airdate: 

First call-out: Evelina Skichko
Bottom two: Anna Amanatidou & Marianna Painesi
Eliminated: Anna Amanatidou
Featured photographer: Marina Vernicos

Episode 28: Xmas Fashion Party - Final
Original airdate: 

Final three: Evelina Skichko, Eirini Noune Kazaryan & Marianna Painesi
Runner-up: Evelina Skichko
Greece's Next Top Model: Eirini Noune Kazaryan
Featured Photographer: Dimitris Skoulos

Results

 The contestant was eliminated outside of judging panel
 The contestant was eliminated 
 The contestant was immune from elimination
 The contestant quit the competition
 The contestant won the competition

Bottom two

 The contestant was eliminated outside of judging panel
 The contestant quit the competition
 The contestant was eliminated after her first time in the bottom two
 The contestant was eliminated after her second time in the bottom two
 The contestant was eliminated after her third time in the bottom two
 The contestant was eliminated after her fourth time in the bottom two
 The contestant was eliminated in the final judging and placed third
 The contestant was eliminated in the final judging and placed as the runner-up

Average  call-out order
Episode 28 is not included.

Ratings 

Note

  Outside top 20.
  Outside top 10.

References

External links
 Official website

Greece
2018 Greek television seasons